The AN/ASQ-228 Advanced Targeting Forward-Looking Infrared (ATFLIR) is a multi-sensor, electro-optical targeting pod incorporating thermographic camera, low-light television camera, target laser rangefinder/laser designator, and laser spot tracker  developed and manufactured by Raytheon. It is used to provide navigation and targeting for military aircraft in adverse weather and using precision-guided munitions such as laser-guided bombs. It is intended to replace the earlier AN/AAS-38 Nite Hawk pod in US Navy service.

ATFLIR is 72 in (183 cm) long, weighs 420 lb (191 kg), and has a slant range of 40 mi (64.3 km), said to be useful at altitude of up to 50,000 ft (15,240 m). It has fewer parts than many previous systems, which is intended to improve serviceability (although early examples, in service with VFA-115 'Eagles' in 2003 experienced problems). Crews indicate that it offers much greater target resolution and image accuracy than previous systems.

ATFLIR presently is used only by the US Navy on the Boeing F/A-18E/F Super Hornet and the earlier F/A-18C/D and with Marine Corps F/A-18Cs when deployed onboard aircraft carriers. It is normally carried on one of the fuselage hardpoints otherwise used for AIM-120 AMRAAM missiles. 410 pods were delivered to the U.S. Navy.  Pods have also been delivered to Switzerland and Australia, and six pods will be delivered to Malaysia.

The US Navy (USN) is considering options to either improve or replace ATFLIR because of current hardware readiness state and sustainment costs.

References

External links 
 Raytheon ATFLIR web page (archived)

Raytheon Company products
Targeting pods
Military electronics of the United States
Military equipment introduced in the 2000s